Vaadaka Gunda is a 1989 Indian Malayalam film, directed by Gandhikuttan and produced by Vaikkam Mani. The film stars Jagathy Sreekumar, Suresh Gopi, Vaikkam Mani and Captain Raju in the lead roles. The film has musical score by Perumbavoor G. Ravindranath.

Cast

Jagathy Sreekumar
Suresh Gopi
Vaikkam Mani
Captain Raju
Bindya
Disco Shanti
Kollam Ajith
M. G. Soman
Poojappura Ravi
Vembayam Thampi
 Jayalalita

Soundtrack
The music was composed by Perumbavoor G. Ravindranath and the lyrics were written by Sreekumaran Thampi.

References

External links
 

1989 films
1980s Malayalam-language films